Sankuru may refer to

 Sankuru, one of the provinces of the Democratic Republic of the Congo
 Sankuru District, a former district of the Belgian Congo and the Democratic Republic of the Congo
 Sankuru Nature Reserve,  protected area in the Democratic Republic of the Congo established in 2007
 Sankuru River, a major river in the Democratic Republic of the Congo

 Chancel Ilunga Sankuru (born 1995), Congolese middle-distance runner.